Hide & Seek is the second extended play by South Korean girl group Purple Kiss. It was released on September 8, 2021, by RBW.

Background and release 
On August 23, 2021, RBW announced that Purple Kiss will release their second extended play titled Hide & Seek on September 8, 2021, along with a logo motion teaser. Later that day, the group's first concept photo was released.

Commercial performance
The album recorded 43,924 sales on the month of September, and peaked at number 5 on the 37th week of 2021.

Critical reception
In addition, Zombie has been listed as one of the 'The Best K-Pop Tracks of 2021' by Dazed. Dazed stated "Led by solid funk and disco influences, “Zombie” utilises an isolated electric guitar riff as a punchy transition, airy strings on the chorus, and plenty of bass to keep it at a pacey clip. On paper, it’s straightforward but this is merely a reliable base camp from which to scale to greater heights. Its secret weapon is two-fold – run riot with a visual mash-up of concepts (horror, girl crush, cute) and unleash Purple Kiss vocally."

Year-end lists

Track listing

Charts

Monthly charts

Sales

Release history

References 

2021 EPs
Korean-language EPs